The 2014 season is Global's 4th season in Division I in the United Football League (UFL) which is the Philippines premier league based in the National Capital Region.

This edition, the 2014 United Football League, introduces a longer format of competition that Division I teams will play their opponents three times during the season instead of two. This also marks the debut season of their new head coach Leigh Manson after replacing Brian Reid.

United Football League

All times were Philippine Standard Time – UTC+08:00

References

2014 in Philippine football
Global Makati F.C. seasons